White Light, aka Gene Clark, is the second solo album by Gene Clark, former member of The Byrds. It only achieved commercial success in the Netherlands, where rock critics also voted it album of the year. Like all of his post-Byrds records, it did very poorly on the US charts.

In June 2018, independent reissue label Intervention Records released White Light on vinyl and as a hybrid CD/SACD.

Background
Clark's backing band on the album included producer and guitarist  Jesse Edwin Davis, bassist Chris Ethridge of the Flying Burrito Brothers, organist Michael Utley, along with pianist Ben Sidran and drummer Gary Mallaber, both of the Steve Miller Band. Although Clark began another album for A&M, the label stopped the sessions before that album was completed. Those tracks were available in the Netherlands on Clark's 1973 album Roadmaster, which was not released in the United States until 1994.

Reception

Music critic Thom Jurek, writing for AllMusic, wrote that the album "has established itself as one of the greatest singer/songwriter albums ever made... Using melodies mutated out of country, and revealing that he was the original poet and architect of the Byrds' sound on White Light, Clark created a wide open set of tracks that are at once full of space, a rugged gentility, and are harrowingly intimate in places. His reading of Bob Dylan's "Tears of Rage", towards the end of the record rivals, if not eclipses, the Band's. Less wrecked and ravaged, Clark's song is more a bewildered tome of resignation to a present and future in the abyss. Now this is classic rock."

Track listing

Personnel
Musicians
Gene Clark – vocals, acoustic guitar, harmonica
Jesse Ed Davis – electric guitar, bottleneck guitar
John Selk – acoustic guitar
Chris Ethridge – bass
Gary Mallaber – drums
Mike Utley – organ
Ben Sidran – piano
Bobbye Hall – congas, percussion

Production
Jesse Ed Davis – producer, mixing
Joe Zagarino – engineer
Baker Bigsby – assistant engineer

References

1971 albums
Gene Clark albums
A&M Records albums
Albums recorded at A&M Studios